Mallary Hope Whitener (born June 21, 1987 in Cohutta, Georgia) is an American country music singer-songwriter. She released her debut single, "Love Lives On", in July 2009, followed by an EP of the same name on August 4, 2009. Both this song and its follow-up, "Blossom in the Dust," have made the Hot Country Songs charts.

Musical career
Mallary Hope released a digital EP, Love Lives On, on August 4, 2009. This EP includes the title track, as well as "Times Like These" and "Wildflowers". "Love Lives On" debuted at 57 on the U.S. Billboard Hot Country Songs charts dated for August 22, 2009. Jon Caramanica, from The New York Times, included Mallary as part of the new face of country music saying, "The next generation proposes a range of options. It includes...young women with a more traditional style, like Mallary Hope." CMT.com (Country Music Television) praised Hope, saying, "She has a beautifully soothing voice and uses it to its full effect on "Love Lives On," bringing all the sadness out of the song she wrote for her sister and anyone else who has a spouse in the military," and Matt Bjorke of Roughstock said that Hope sounded like a young Faith Hill and that the song "is nevertheless a song that can and should do well at radio." Hope's second single "Blossom in the Dust" was released to radio on February 22, 2010, and debuted at number 60 on the chart for the week of March 20, 2010, peaking at 48.

Hope co-wrote Lauren Alaina's late 2011 single "Georgia Peaches" along with "The Locket", another song on Lauren Alaina's debut album.
She sang background vocals on "I Will Love You Still", a track from True Believers, a 2013 album by Darius Rucker and performed a duet with Rucker on the song "Baby, I'm Right", which is included on his fourth album called "Southern Style" which was released in 2015.

Personal life
Hope married Ryan Dokke on April 13, 2014.
Mallary and her husband Ryan welcomed daughter Scarlett Ruth Dokke on January 19, 2015.
On November 8, 2016, the couple welcomed their second daughter, Savannah Ryan.

Discography

Album

Extended plays

Singles

Music videos

References

American women country singers
American country singer-songwriters
Living people
MCA Records artists
Curb Records artists
People from Dalton, Georgia
Country musicians from Georgia (U.S. state)
1986 births
21st-century American women
Singer-songwriters from Georgia (U.S. state)